The rank insignia of the Guardia di Finanza are worn on jackets and shoulder epaulettes.

Rank structure

Officers

Non-commissioned officers

See also 
 Italian Army ranks
 Italian Navy ranks
 Italian Air Force ranks
 Rank insignia of the Arm of Carabineers

Bibliography
 Legislative decree 15 March 2010 n.66, ‘Code of Military Order’.
 NATO – STANAG 2116 ed. 6, 25 February 2010

 
Military insignia
Military ranks of Italy